The Adventures of El Ballo is a 2D side-scrolling platform game for  Mac OS 9 and X released by Ambrosia Software on September 19, 2005. It focuses on blatant, crude humor and mild animated nudity and includes parental controls to disable some content. The game was poorly received by Macintosh publications.

Plot
The game takes place on the planet Testicular which is located in the "Circular Assmosphere" solar system. Testicular is populated by an unsanitary but peace-loving and playful alien race. The evil Dr. Cough is out to cleanse the planet Testicular and to make the inhabitants give up their love of nakedness in favor of being clothed. El Ballo, one of the aliens who lives on Testicular with such companions as "Butts" and "Boobs," must take on the Chlorine Copters, Mic the Mop, and other henchmen of Dr. Cough before heading to the castle where El Ballo must deal with the evil doctor.

Reception
In MacWorld, Peter Cohen complimented the game's art and music but felt that the game play itself lacked fun. Inside Mac Games gave El Ballo a 3.75 out of 10 rating, stating that the gameplay is unexciting though the game's plot is unique. The reviewer commented, "It is possible to complete about 90% of the game by simply holding down one of the directional keys and constantly jumping or firing until you reach the end." Also mentioned was the issue of the game's adult theme posing concerns for parents and that the game's parental control feature is easy to bypass.

References

2005 video games
Ambrosia Software games
MacOS games
Classic Mac OS games
Platform games
Video games developed in the United States